The Ministry of Energy and Mineral Resources of the Republic of Indonesia is an Indonesian ministry responsible for providing assistance to the President and Vice President in performing government's affairs in the field of energy and mineral resources. The current minister is Arifin Tasrif.

History
In history before 1945, the first institution that handled mining in Dutch East Indies is Department of Mining (Dienst van den Mijnbouw) Following Japanese occupation of the Dutch East Indies in 1942, the department name was changed to Chisitsu (地質) Chosajo, then to Mining and Geology Bureau (Djawatan Tambang dan Geologi) after Proclamation of Indonesian Independence  which was formed on 11 September 1945 under the Ministry of Prosperity.

In year 1952 the bureau was under the Ministry of Industry. It was changed to the Mining Directorate which consisted of the Mining Service Center and the Geological Service Center. Following year 1957 the Ministry of Economy was split into the Ministry of Trade and the Ministry of Industry, the centers under the Mining Directorate were changed to the Mining and Geological Services.

The government established the Bureau of Oil and Gas which is under the Ministry of Basic Industry and Mining in 1961. The next year Geology and Mining Bureau was changed to the Geology Directorate and Mining Directorate. Following year 1963 Bureau of Oil and Gas was changed into Directorate of Oil and Gas which is under the authority of the Assistant Minister of Mining and State Mining Companies.

Two years after, in 1965, Department of Basic Industry / Mining is divided into three departments namely: Department of Basic Industry, Department of Mining and Department of Oil and Gas Affairs. In June 1965, Minister of Oil and Gas Affairs stipulates the establishment of the Oil and Gas Institution. In 1966 Department of Oil and Gas Affairs is merged into the Ministry of Mines and Oil and Gas which oversees the Department of Oil and Gas. Im Ampera Cabinet, Department of Oil and Gas and the Department of Mining are merged into the Department of Mining.

Department of Mining changed to the Department of Mines and Energy in the next decade (1978). Department of Mines and Energy turned into the Department of Energy and Mineral Resources in 2000. In 2019 in accordance with Perpres 47/2009, the name 'Department' was changed to 'Ministry'.

Organization Structure
Minister
 Deputy Minister
Secretariat General
Directorate General of Oil and Gas
Directorate General of Electricity
Directorate General of Mineral and Coal
Directorate General of New, Renewable Energy and Energy Conservation
Inspectorate General
Geological Agency
Energy and Mineral Resources Research and Development Agency
Human Resources Development Agency for Energy and Mineral Resources
Expert Staff on Institutional and Strategic Planning
Expert Staff in Economics and Finance
Expert Staff for Investment and Production
Expert Staff on Spatial Planning and the Environment
Expert Staff for Communication and Social Affairs

List of ministers

See also
Government of Indonesia

References

Government ministries of Indonesia
Indonesia
Indonesia
Indonesia